is a 1993 Japanese film directed by Tomio Kuriyama.

Awards
17th Japan Academy Prize
Won: Best Actor - Toshiyuki Nishida
Nominated: Best Actor - Rentarō Mikuni

References

1993 films
Films directed by Tomio Kuriyama
1990s Japanese-language films
6
1990s Japanese films